Fairfield-Liverpool Grade Cricket Club is a cricket club based in Fairfield, New South Wales and  Liverpool, New South Wales Australia. Their nickname is the Lions. Their most notable former players are former Australian bowler Doug Bollinger and former NSW players Grant Lambert and Ben Rohrer. Pat Richards, a rugby league footballer for Parramatta Eels, Wests Tigers and Wigan Warriors is also a former player.

See also

References

External links
 

Sydney Grade Cricket clubs
Cricket clubs established in 1905
1905 establishments in Australia
Liverpool, New South Wales